Cybereason is a cybersecurity technology company founded in 2012. It is headquartered in Boston, Massachusetts, with additional office locations in London, UK, Tokyo, Japan, and Tel Aviv, Israel.

History
In July 2012, Cybereason was founded and incorporated in Delaware, United States by Lior Div, an ex-soldier of Israel's Unit 8200.

In 2014, Cybereason established its headquarters in Boston, Massachusetts.

In August 2016, Cybereason incorporated a subsidiary in the United Kingdom.

In June 2017, Cybereason launched Malicious Life, a podcast about the history of cybersecurity.

In 2017, Cybereason established an office in London, England.

Funding
In 2014, Cybereason raised Series A funding from Charles River Ventures. In total, Cybereason reports having raised $88.6M in funding rounds, receiving $59M in its Series C round from Softbank in 2015.
.

In August 2019, Cybereason raised $200 million in new financing from SoftBank Group and its affiliates.

Services
Cybereason offers an endpoint protection platform. It delivers antivirus software, endpoint detection and response with one agent, and a suite of managed services.

Nocturnus is Cybereason's security research arm. The Nocturnus team specializes in discovering new attack methodologies, reverse-engineering malware, and exposing new system vulnerabilities. Nocturnus was the first to discover a vaccination for the 2017 NotPetya and Bad Rabbit cyberattacks.

References

External links 
 www.cybereason.com

Security companies of the United States
Computer security companies